A gang bang is a situation where one person has sexual intercourse with more than two partners. 

Gang bang may also refer to:

Crime
Gang banging, the act of engaging in violence and other criminal activies as a member of a street gang.

Music
Gang Bang, 1999 album by René Berg

Songs
 "Gang Bang" (song), a 2012 song by Madonna
"Gang Bang", a 1972 song by Oscar Brown Jr. from Movin' On
"Gang Bang", a 1974 song by The Sensational Alex Harvey Band from Next
"Gang Bang", a 1994 song by Brand Nubian on Everything is Everything
"Gang Bang", a 1996 song by Dr. Dre and World Class Wreckin' Cru
"Gang Bang", a 2005 song by French band Indochine on Alice & June
"(Having a) Gangbang", a song by Black Lace featured in the 1987 film Rita, Sue and Bob Too
"Gang Bang", a 2012 song by Wiz Khalifa
"Gang Bang", a 2013 song by Bob Seger

See also
Bang Gang, an Icelandic band
Gang banger (disambiguation)